Atanasio Echeverría y Godoy was an 18th-century Mexican botanical artist and naturalist who trained at the Royal Art Academy in Mexico. The genus Echeveria was named in his honour by Augustin Pyramus de Candolle.

Royal Botanical Expedition 
In Mexico City in 1787, Echeverría joined Martin de Sessé y Lacasta and Mariano Mociño Suárez de Figueroa on their Royal Botanical Expedition to New Spain, which had the goal of compiling a great inventory of fauna and flora of New Spain. In 1791, he continued onto the California portion of the expedition, where he made images of 200 plant species. In 1794, he traveled to the Caribbean with Sessé and botanist Jaime Senseve. The group landed in Havana, Cuba, and later traveled to Puerto Rico.

Because of political instability in New Spain caused by the Napoleonic Wars, the project was not completed, and Echeverría left the expedition in 1797.

Guantanamo Commission and later life 
Echeverría then joined the Guantanamo Commission under Conte de Mopox y Jaruco, which traveled across Cuba. On this expedition, 3,700 specimens were collected and 27 new species described. Afterwards, Echeverría briefly traveled to Madrid before returning to Mexico and becoming an art director at the Academy of San Carlos.

See also
Echeveria atropurpurea

References

External links
Illustration of butterflies by Atanasio Echeverría
Hunt Institute
Genus Echeveria
Flora Mexicana via Biodiversity Library

Mexican artists
Mexican naturalists
Year of birth missing
Year of death missing
Mexican people of Basque descent
18th-century Mexican people
18th-century Mexican scientists